Ari Rath (‎; 6 January 1925 – 13 January 2017) was an Austrian-born Israeli journalist and writer.

Biography
Arnold (Ari) Rath was born in Vienna and grew up there. After the Anschluss he came through a Kindertransport as a thirteen-year-old boy to Mandate Palestine.He arrived in Palestine together with his older brother. As one of the founders of Kibbutz Hamadia he lived there for 16 years and studied contemporary history and economics. Rath never married. 

He regained his Austrian citizenship in 2007 and lived there until his death, shortly after his 92nd birthday. He lectured about the country's  Nazi past and political developments in Austria and Israel. in 2012, he published his memoirs in German, “Ari heißt Löwe” (Ari Means Lion).

Rath died on 13 January 2017 in Vienna at the age of 92.

Journalism career
After turning to journalism he became editor of The Jerusalem Post in 1975, and in 1979 was appointed its Editor-in-Chief.  In this capacity he belonged, together with Shimon Peres, to the inner circle of friends of David Ben-Gurion. According to a Jerusalem Post journalist who worked with him, his joint editorship with Erwin Frenkel in 1975-1989 "provided a contrast in styles and personalities – Frenkel’s cool, almost unflappable detachment and Rath’s excitable, emotional character, quick to explode in anger and just as quick to forgive, forget and embrace."

After leaving The Jerusalem Post in 1989, he worked as a freelance writer, taught at the University of Potsdam and was news editor of the on-line journal Partners for Peace.

Rath was an advocate for a peaceful coexistence of Israelis and Palestinians. He was a founding member of the Next Century Foundation, a second-track group working for peace and reconciliation.

Awards and recognition

For his contribution to  Israeli-German/Austrian dialog he was awarded several honors. In 2005 he won the German Bundesverdienstkreuz. His last  award for his "dialog between Vienna and Israel" was the Goldenes Ehrenzeichen (golden badge of honor) of the city of Vienna.

In 2005, Rath  received a Special Prize in the British House of Lords in the shape of an olive tree from the International Council for Press and Broadcasting in recognition of his achievement and tireless work for rapprochement and peace. This was in lieu of the Peace for Media awards, which were not given that year.

Published works 
 Rath, Ari a.o. Auf dem Weg zum Frieden. Artikel und Essays aus fünf Jahrzehnten, Berlin 2005.
 Rath, Ari; Frenkel, Erwin. Front page Israel. Major events 1932–1986 as reflected in the front pages of The Jerusalem Post, Jerusalem 1986, .

References

External links 

 Ari Rath
 Ari Rath Becomes Austrian Again Austrian Press Agency, 6 May 2005
 Image of Ari Rath

1925 births
2017 deaths
Jewish emigrants from Austria to Mandatory Palestine after the Anschluss
Israeli journalists
Kindertransport refugees
The Jerusalem Post editors
Officers Crosses of the Order of Merit of the Federal Republic of Germany
Academic staff of the University of Potsdam